George Avery Young (June 1866 – 21 January 1900) was an English-born sportsman who played international rugby union for Wales and cricket for Glamorgan.

Rugby career
Although born in Tynemouth in the North of England, Young moved to Wales where he came to note as a sportsman. His first major club was Cardiff, and while playing with the Blue and Blacks he was selected to represent Wales in the country's opening game of the 1886 Home Nations Championship, against England. Under the captaincy of Charlie Newman, Young was one of five Cardiff players to represent Wales on the day, with teammates Billy Douglas and Dai Lewis joining Young as first caps. His second and final cap was the next game of the 1886 Championship, this time against Scotland, which Wales again lost.

During the 1886/87 season, Young was given the captaincy of Cardiff, which he held for two seasons.

International games played
Wales
  1886
  1886

Bibliography

References

External links
 The Malvern Register, 1865–1904 (1905. pp. 123.

1866 births
1900 deaths
Cardiff RFC players
Cricketers from Tynemouth
English rugby union players
Glamorgan cricketers
People educated at Malvern College
Rugby union forwards
Rugby union players from Tynemouth
Wales international rugby union players